Álvaro Obregón (1880–1928) was the 46th president of Mexico.

Álvaro Obregón may also refer to:

 Álvaro Obregón Tapia (1916–1993), a Mexican politician, son of the president
 Álvaro Obregón, Mexico City, a borough
 Álvaro Obregón Municipality, in Michoacán
 Álvaro Obregón, Michoacán, a town in the municipality
 Álvaro Obregón, Quintana Roo, a village in Othón P. Blanco Municipality
 Álvaro Obregón metro station, a future Mexico City Metro station
 Álvaro Obregón (Mexico City Metrobús), a BRT station in Mexico City